= FC Slavia =

FC Slavia may refer to:

- FC Slavia Mozyr: Belarusian football club
- SK Slavia Prague, Czech football club
- PFC Slavia Sofia, Bulgarian football club
